Tanya Pouwhare (born Blenheim, New Zealand) is a New Zealand former radio and television personality.   

She started her radio career at Coastal FM, in Kaikoura at the age of 15, a summer station run by independent Sounds FM.  After leaving Marlborough Girls' college she joined Marlborough's local Iwi Radio Station Wairua FM, before moving back to the more commercially run Sounds FM in 1991. She moved to Energy FM in New Plymouth in 1993, one of the RadioWorks stable of provincial stations managed by Don Raine and Steven Joyce. In 1996, she moved to Palmerston North to work for The Radio Network station Classic Hits. Pouwhare has also worked for radio stations The Edge FM, The Rock FM, Solid Gold FM and Radio Pacific. 

Pouwhare moved to television production mostly as production manager. With Touchdown Television she was the production manager in of Treasure Island. In 2004, she became a senior television production manager at Greenstone Pictures with credits including Crash Investigation Unit and Highway Patrol for Australia's Channel Seven.

Tanya was also a recurring supporting role in New Zealand's children's comedy drama series The Amazing Extraordinary Friends. She appeared as satirical newsreader Dana Dinkley in all three series.

In 2014 she moved back to Marlborough and left the radio and television sector.

References

Year of birth missing (living people)
Living people
New Zealand radio presenters
New Zealand television presenters
New Zealand women radio presenters
New Zealand women television presenters
New Zealand emigrants to Australia
People from Kaikōura

External links 

 Tanya Pouwhare on IMDb https://www.imdb.com/name/nm0660109/